The following outline is provided as an overview of and topical guide to literature (prose, written or oral, including fiction and non-fiction, drama, and poetry). See also the Outline of poetry.

What type of thing is literature? 
Literature can be described as all of the following:

 Communication – activity of conveying information. Communication requires a sender, a message, and an intended recipient, although the receiver need not be present or aware of the sender's intent to communicate at the time of communication; thus communication can occur across vast distances in time and space.
 Written communication (writing) – representation of language in a textual medium through the use of a set of signs or symbols (known as a writing system).
 Subdivision of culture – shared attitudes, values, goals, and practices that characterizes an institution, organization, or group.
 One of the arts – imaginative, creative, or nonscientific branch of knowledge, especially as studied academically.

Essence of literature

 Composition –
 World literature –

Forms of literature

Oral literary genres

Oral literature
 Oral poetry – 
 Epic poetry –
 Legend – 
 Mythology – 
 Ballad – 
 Folktale – 
 Oral Narrative  – 
 Oral History – 
 Urban legend –

Written literary genres

 Cordel Literature
 Children's literature – 
 Constrained writing – 
 Erotic literature – 
 Electronic literature – Literary fiction and poetry that uses the capabilities of computers and networks
 Digital poetry – 
 Interactive fiction – 
 Hypertext fiction – literary fiction written with hypertextual links 
 Fan fiction 
 Cell phone novel 
 Poetry (see that article for an extensive list of subgenres and types)
 Aubade – 
 Clerihew – 
 Epic – 
 Grook – form of short aphoristic poem invented by the Danish poet and scientist Piet Hein, who wrote over 7,000 of them.
 Haiku – form of short Japanese poetry consisting of three lines.
 Instapoetry
 Tanka – classical Japanese poetry of five lines.
 Lied – 
 Limerick – a kind of a witty, humorous, or nonsense poem, especially one in five-line  or  meter with a strict rhyme scheme (aabba), which is sometimes obscene with humorous intent.
 Lyric – 
 Ode – 
 Rhapsody – 
 Song – 
 Sonnet – 
 Speculative poetry – 
 Prison literature – 
 Rhymed prose – 
 Saj'
 Maqama
 Fu (literature)
 Rayok

Non-fiction

Non-fiction
 Autobiography –
 Biography – 
 Diaries and Journals – 
 Essay – 
 Literary criticism – 
 Memoir – 
 Outdoor literature – 
 Self-Help – 
 Spiritual autobiography – 
 Travel literature –

Fiction genres 

Fiction
 Manga –
 Adventure novel –
 Airport novels –
 Comedy –
 Parody – 
 Satire –
Crime fiction –
 Detective fiction – 
 Hardboiled – 
 Whodunit  –
 Newgate novel –
Erotica –
Fable –
Fairy tale –
Family saga –
Gothic –
 Southern Gothic –
Historical fiction –
Inspirational fiction –
Invasion literature –
Mystery –
Philosophical literature –
Inspirational fiction (religious literature)  –
Psychological fiction –
Psychological thriller –
Romance (heroic literature) – 
Romance –
 Historical romance – 
 Regency romance – 
 Inspirational romance –
 Paranormal romance –
Saga –
Speculative fiction –
 Alternate history – 
 Fantasy –  (for more details see Fantasy subgenres, fantasy literature)
 Epic fantasy –
 Science fantasy – 
 Steampunk – 
 Urban fantasy – 
 Weird fantasy –
 Horror – 
 Lovecraftian horror – 
 Weird menace – 
 Science fiction –  (for more details see Science fiction genres and related topics
 Cyberpunk – 
 Hard science fiction – 
 Space opera – 
 Supernatural fiction –
Sensation novel –
Slave narrative –
Thriller –
 Conspiracy fiction – 
 Legal thriller – 
 Spy fiction/Political thriller –
 Techno-thriller –
Western fiction –

Literature by region and country

Asia 
East Asian literature
Chinese literature
Japanese literature
Korean literature
Mongolian literature
Taiwanese literature
South Asian literature
Bangladeshi literature
Bhutanese literature
Indian literature
Assamese literature
Bengali literature
Bhojpuri language#Bhojpuri literature
Indian English literature
Gujarati literature
Hindi literature
Kannada literature
Kashmiri literature
Konkani literature
Malayalam literature
Maithili literature
Meitei literature
Marathi literature
Mizo literature
Nepali literature
Odia literature
Punjabi literature
Rajasthani literature
Sanskrit literature
Sindhi literature
Tamil literature
Telugu literature
Urdu literature
Maldivian literature
Nepalese literature
Pakistani literature
Sri Lankan literature
Southeast Asian literature
Brunei literature
Burmese literature
Cambodian literature
Indonesian literature
Laotian literature
Malaysian literature
Philippine literature
Singaporean literature
Thai literature
Timoran literature
Vietnamese literature
Central Asian literature
Kazakh literature
Kyrgyz literature
Tajik literature 
Turkmen literature
Uzbek literature

Europe 

 Albanian literature
 Andorran literature
 Armenian literature 
 Austrian literature
 Azerbaijani literature
 Basque literature
 Belarusian literature
 Belgian literature
 Flemish literature
 Bosnian literature
 Bulgarian literature
 British literature
 Cornish literature
 English literature
 Manx literature
 Jèrriais literature
 Scottish literature
 Scots-language literature
 Scottish Gaelic literature
 Ulster literature
 Welsh literature in English
 Welsh-language literature
 Croatian literature
 Cypriot literature
 Turkish Cypriot literature
 Czech literature
 Danish literature
 Faroese literature
 Greenlandic literature
 Dutch literature
 Frisian literature
Esperanto literature
 Estonian literature
 Finnish literature
 Åland literature
 French literature - also Francophone literature
 Breton literature
 Occitan literature
 Georgian literature 
 Abkhaz literature
 Chechen literature
 Ossetian literature
 German literature
 Greek literature
 Hungarian literature
 Icelandic literature
 Irish literature
 Gaelic literature
 Literature of Northern Ireland
 Italian literature
 Friulian literature
 Sardinian literature
 Venetian literature
 Western Lombard literature
 Kazakh literature
 Kosovar literature
 Latvian literature
 Liechtensteiner literature
 Lithuanian literature
 Luxembourg literature
 Macedonian literature
 Maltese literature
 Moldovan literature
 Monégasque literature
 Montenegrin literature
 Norwegian literature
 Polish literature
 Portuguese literature
 Romanian literature
 Russian literature
 Sammarinese literature
 Serbian literature
 Slovak literature
 Slovene literature
 Spanish literature
 Aragonese literature 
 Asturian literature 
 Catalan literature
 Galician-language literature
 Swedish literature
 Swiss literature
 Turkish literature
 Ukrainian literature
 Yiddish literature

Middle East and North Africa 
Afghan literature
Algerian literature
Arabic literature
Bahraini literature
Egyptian literature
Ethiopian literature
Emirati literature
Iranian literature
Iraqi literature
Israeli literature
Jordanian literature
Kuwaiti literature
Kurdish literature
Lebanese literature
Libyan literature
Moroccan literature
Oman literature
Pakistani literature
Palestinian literature
Persian literature
Qatari literature
Saudi literature
Syrian literature
Tunisian literature
Turkish literature
Yemeni literature

North and South America 
 North American literature
 American literature
African American literature
Native American literature
Southern literature
Deaf American literature
 Canadian literature
Quebec literature
 Mexican literature
Caribbean literature
Cuban literature
Dominican Republic literature
Guadeloupean Literature
Haitian literature
Jamaican literature
Martinican Literature
Puerto Rican literature
Barthélemois literature
Trinidad and Tobago literature
Central American literature
Costa Rican literature
Salvadoran literature
Guatemalan literature
Honduran literature
Nicaraguan literature
Panamanian literature
South American literature
Argentine literature
Bolivian literature
Brazilian literature
Chilean literature
Colombian literature
Ecuadorean literature
Guyanese literature
Paraguayan literature
Peruvian literature
Uruguayan literature
Venezuelan literature

Oceania 
 Oceanian literature
 Australian literature
 Fijian literature
 Kiribati literature
 Marshall Islands literature
 Micronesian literature
 Nauran literature
 New Zealand literature
 Papua New Guinean literature
 Palau literature
 Samoan literature
 Solomon Islands literature
 Tongan literature
 Tuvalan literature
 Vanuatu literature

Sub-saharan Africa 

East African literature
Burundian literature
Comorian literature
Djibouti literature
Eritrean literature 	
Kenyan literature 	
Madagascar literature
Malawian literature
Mauritian literature
Mozambique literature
Réunion literature
Rwandan literature
Seychelles literature
Somalian literature 
Somaliland literature
South Sudanese literature
Sudanese literature
Tanzanian literature
Ugandan literature
Zambian literature
Zimbabwean literature
Central African literature
Angolan literature 	
Cameroon literature
Literature of Central African Republic
Chadian literature 	
Congolese literature
Equatorial Guinea literature
Gabon literature
São Tomé and Príncipe literature
Southern African literature
Botswanan literature
Swazi literature
Lesotho literature
Namibian literature 
South African literature 
Afrikaans literature

West African literature
Beninese literature
Burkina Faso literature
Literature of Cape Verde
Gambian literature
Ghanan literature
Guinean literature
Guinea-Bissau literature
Ivory Coast literature
Liberian literature 	
Malian literature 	
Mauritanian literature
Literature of Niger
Nigerian literature
Yoruba literature 
Senegalese literature
Sierra Leone literature
Togo literature

History of literature

History of literature
 History of the book
 History of theater
 History of science fiction
 History of ideas
 Intellectual history

Literature by written language 

 Bronze Age literature
 Sumerian
 Ancient Egyptian
 Akkadian

 Classical literature
 Avestan
 Chinese
 Greek
 Hebrew
 Latin
 Pali
 Prakrit
 Sanskrit
 Syriac
 Sangam literature
 Middle Persian literature

 Medieval literature
 Medieval Dutch literature
 Medieval French literature
 Byzantine literature
 Medieval Bulgarian literature
 Old English literature
 Middle English literature
 Medieval German literature
 Old Irish literature
 Old Norse literature
 Georgian literature
 Catalan literature
 Medieval Welsh literature
 Renaissance literature
 Early Modern literature
 Baroque

English literature
French literature
German literature
Italian literature
Spanish literature

 Bengali literature
 Hindi literature
 Kannada literature
 Newari literature
 Telugu literature

Chinese literature
Japanese literature
Korean literature

 Arabic literature
 Persian literature
 Armenian literature
 Turkish literature

Literature by century 
 Ancient literature - until the 6th century CE
 Early medieval literature - 6th through 9th centuries
 10th century in literature
 11th century in literature
 12th century in literature
 13th century in literature
 14th century in literature
 15th century in literature
 16th century in literature
 17th century in literature
 18th century in literature
 19th century in literature
 20th century in literature
 21st century in literature

Literature by year 
 List of years in literature
 Table of years in literature

General literature concepts

Book 
Western canon – 
 Teaching of writing:
 Composition – 
 Rhetoric – 
Poetry – 
 Prosody – 
 Meter – 
 Scansion – 
 Constrained writing – 
Poetics – 
Villanelle – 
Sonnet – 
Sestina – 
Ghazal – 
Ballad – 
Blank verse – 
Free verse – 
Epic poetry – 
 Prose – 
 Fiction – 
 Non-fiction – 
 Biography – 
 Prose genres – 
 Essay – 
 Flash prose – 
 Hypertext fiction – 
 Journalism – 
 Novel – 
 Novella – 
 Short story – 
Theater – 
 History of theater – 
Rhetoric – 
 Metaphor – 
 Metonymy – 
 Symbol – 
 Allegory – 
 Basic procedural knowledge
 Poetry analysis – 
 effective reasoning in argument writing
 Narratology
 False document – 
 Frame tale – 
 Anecdote – 
 In Medias Res – 
 Point of view – 
 Literary criticism – an application of literary theory
 Marxist literary criticism – 
 Semiotic literary interpretation – 
 Psychoanalytic literary interpretation – 
 Feminist literary interpretation – 
 New historicism – 
 Queer literary interpretation –

Literary awards

 List of literary awards
 List of poetry awards

Persons influential in the field of literature

 List of authors
 :Category:Literary critics
 List of writers
 List of women writers

Literature creation 
 Author
 Publisher
 Editor
 Copy editor

Literature distribution 
 Publishing
 Library
 Bookselling
 Magazine

See also

 Index of literature articles
 Lists of books
 English studies
 List of poems
List of poetry collections

References

External links

The Internet Public Library listing for Literature
Nobel Prize in Literature

Wikipedia missing topics
Literature
Literature